Robert or Bob Bratton may refer to:

Robert Franklin Brattan (1845–1894), American politician
Robert Bratton (sound editor) (1918–2008), American sound editor
Robert Bratton, JP chairman, see 1954 Birthday Honours
Bob Bratton (banker), see First Charter Bank
Bob Bratton, sheriff, see Carty Finkbeiner